Basic allowance for housing (BAH) is a United States military entitlement given to many military members. It was previously called Basic allowance for quarters (BAQ) and is administered by the Defense Travel Management Office (DTMO).

How it works

Eligibility factors
Basic allowance for housing is given to members so that they can provide housing for themselves and their dependents (usually spouse and children). BAH is given when the member or their dependents do not occupy government quarters or barracks.

BAH is non-taxable money paid on a monthly basis. There are 3 factors for determining the amount of BAH:
Marital status – In Britain, this allowance used to be called "marriage allowance" in the 1930s. In the United States, as of 2018, the U.S. military required its members to produce marriage documentation.
Pay grade – This is essentially synonymous with rank, the higher the grade, the higher the BAH.
Location in the United States – BAH is intended to match the average monthly rent in the area where the member is stationed, thus more expensive regions (they are indexed by zip codes) to live allocate more BAH. Depending on the status of the assignment (such as temporary duty, or an unaccompanied assignment) the BAH may be calculated where the dependents actually reside.
Dependents – There are 2 types or BAH, with dependents and without dependents. The rationale behind this is that a single person doesn't need as much room as a couple or a family.

The following do not affect the amount of BAH:
The number of dependents (a member with a spouse and no children and a spouse and one or several children receive the same amount of BAH).
The actual amount paid for rent.
The size of the unit (unlike other calculations like HUD's FMR)

Reservists who are activated, even if they are housed by the military during their mobilization, are still paid BAH on the assumption that a reservist still may have the civilian obligations (like a mortgage) that BAH is designed to offset.

Lastly, veterans who are full-time students taking advantage of the Post 9-11 GI Bill are given an allowance pegged to the BAH with dependents rate for an E-5, irrespective of their rank or dependent status.

A service member who is married makes substantially more allowance money than a single member. Reports of soldiers marrying for the extra pay are not uncommon.

Determining allowances
Robert D. Niehaus, Inc. (RDN), a private firm based in California is contracted to provide the data used to calculate BAH allowances.

Locations
Every location in the U.S. has a BAH, including those without a significant military population.  Non-military areas are combined with similar priced rental markets based on U.S. Housing and Urban Development (HUD)'s Fair Market Rent (FMR) data, and then use same RDN BAH source data available for similar areas. These comparably priced groups are called "County Cost Groups" (CCGs).  There are 39 CCGs in the U.S, consisting of half of all counties (about 1,500) containing less than two percent of the uniformed services' population eligible to receive BAH.

Methodology
The following data sources are used to determine BAH:
 Current residential vacancies, identified in local newspapers and real estate rental listings
 Telephone interviews
 Yellow page listings of apartments
 Real estate management companies
 Real estate professionals
 Fort/post/base housing referral offices
 On-site evaluations
 Internet research
 Housing data available from other government agencies

Timing
BAH changes every year, based on data gather during the Summer / Spring active rental seasons.  Generally BAH changes 2–5% annually and 5–10% in "hot" markets.

OHA
Overseas Housing Allowance, or OHA, may be given instead of BAH when a member is stationed outside the United States. BAH and OHA are similar, but have some significant differences. In OHA, each country, and each region in a country have a cap on a per month basis as to what the military will pay for housing. OHA is the exact amount of monthly rent in the local currency (so the exchange rate is taken into consideration each month as the member is paid in US dollars) up to the cap.

OHA may also be paid in certain circumstances if the dependents are living overseas, for example if a member is deployed, and the dependents stay in a country outside of the US.

Frequently a "utility allowance" also accompanies OHA. This is usually a flat rate given to the member to cover the cost of utilities, regardless of the actual amount.

Acronyms
 Basic Housing Allowance (BAH) – The housing subsidy paid to military members
 Military Housing Areas (MHAs) – Zip codes combine to make rental markets surrounding a duty area of metropolitan region.  There are 350 MHAs in the U.S. named for installation of nearest city.
 Military Housing Offices (MHOs) – Local base department involved in BAH
 County Cost Groups (CCGs) – Comparably priced U.S. rental markets.  There are 39 in the U.S.

See also
 Basic Pay
 Leave and Earnings Statement (LES)
 Overseas Housing Allowance (OHA)

References

External links
 BAH FAQs
 BAH Interactive Map Calculator 
 BAH Calculator
 A Primer on the Basic Allowance for Housing (BAH)
 Official BAH
 Official Overseas Housing Allowance Query
 BAH Charts by rank and location (in USA)
 How big of a house is each rank expected to have?

Marriage in the United States
Subsidies
United States military pay and benefits